The 1888 United States presidential election in Louisiana took place on November 6, 1888, as part of the 1888 United States presidential election. Voters chose eight representatives, or electors to the Electoral College, who voted for president and vice president.

Louisiana voted for the Democratic nominee, incumbent President Grover Cleveland, over the Republican nominee, Benjamin Harrison. Cleveland won the state by a large margin of 46.91%.

Results

See also
 United States presidential elections in Louisiana

Notes

References

Louisiana
1888
1888 Louisiana elections